is an athletic stadium in Ōtsu City, Japan.

External links
Ōtsu city parks and greenery association - Ojiyama sport park

Athletics (track and field) venues in Japan
Football venues in Japan
Rugby union stadiums in Japan
Sports venues in Shiga Prefecture
Buildings and structures in Ōtsu
Sports venues completed in 1964
1964 establishments in Japan